Dan Waern (born 17 January 1933) is a retired Swedish middle-distance runner, who in 1957 became the first Swede to run a sub-four-minute mile. The same year he was awarded the Svenska Dagbladet Gold Medal.

Waern competed in the 1500 m at the 1956 and 1960 Olympics and finished fourth in 1960. Earlier in 1958 he won a silver medal at the European championships over 1500 m and set a world record in the 1000 m. In 1961, he was disqualified by the IAAF for professionalism.

Waern held Swedish titles in the 800 m (1958–60) and 1500 m (1956–61).

References

1933 births
Living people
Swedish male middle-distance runners
Olympic athletes of Sweden
Athletes (track and field) at the 1956 Summer Olympics
Athletes (track and field) at the 1960 Summer Olympics
Örgryte IS Friidrott athletes
European Athletics Championships medalists
Sportspeople from Södermanland County